This is a list of Italian Ministers of Public Works. The list shows also the ministers that served under the same office but with other names, in fact this Ministry has changed name many times.

List of Ministers
 Parties

 Governments

Public Works